Matti Pietikäinen (29 October 1927 – 15 November 1967) was a Finnish ski jumper who won a world title in 1954 and placed fourth at the 1948 Winter Olympics, four places above his brother Aatto.

References

External links

1927 births
1967 deaths
People from Kuopio
Finnish male ski jumpers
Ski jumpers at the 1948 Winter Olympics
FIS Nordic World Ski Championships medalists in ski jumping
Sportspeople from North Savo
20th-century Finnish people